Alfred Kaiser (born 6 June 1947) is a French former professional footballer who played as a forward.

Honours 
Lens

 Coupe de France runner-up: 1974–75

References 

1947 births
Living people
Sportspeople from Bas-Rhin
French footballers
Association football forwards
K. Patro Eisden Maasmechelen players
K.F.C. Diest players
RC Lens players
Paris FC players
FCSR Haguenau players
Belgian Pro League players
Ligue 1 players
Ligue 2 players
French Division 3 (1971–1993) players
French Division 4 (1978–1993) players

French expatriate footballers
Expatriate footballers in Germany
Expatriate footballers in Belgium
French expatriate sportspeople in Germany
French expatriate sportspeople in Belgium
Footballers from Alsace